Clonostachys is a genus of fungi in the order Hypocreales and family Bionectriaceae.  Clonostachys rosea f. rosea is of interest as a biological pest control agent.

Species
The following are currently (2022) included by the Global Biodiversity Information Facility (with known other isolates yet to be described):
 Clonostachys agarwalii (Kushwaha) Schroers
 Clonostachys apocyni (Peck) Rossman, L.Lombard & Crous
 Clonostachys aranearum Wan H.Chen, Y.F.Han, J.D.Liang, X.Zou, Z.Q.Liang & D.C.Jin
 Clonostachys araucaria
 Clonostachys asymmetrica (Samuels) Schroers
 Clonostachys aurantia (Penz. & Sacc.) Rossman, L.Lombard & Crous
 Clonostachys aureofulvella
 Clonostachys blumenaviae (Rehm) Rossman, L.Lombard & Crous
 Clonostachys buxi
 Clonostachys byssicola
 Clonostachys candelabrum (Bonord.) Schroers
 Clonostachys candida Harz
 Clonostachys capitata
 Clonostachys catenulatum
 Clonostachys chlorina Schroers
 Clonostachys chloroleuca G.M.Moreira, L.M.Abreu, Pfenning & Schroers
 Clonostachys coccicola (J.A.Stev.) H.T.Dao
 Clonostachys compacta Petch
 Clonostachys compactiuscula (Sacc.) D.Hawksw. & W.Gams
 Clonostachys cylindrospora Höhn.
 Clonostachys dichotoma Bayl.Ell.
 Clonostachys divergens Schroers
 Clonostachys epichloe
 Clonostachys farinosa (Henn.) Rossman
 Clonostachys gibberosa (Schroers) Rossman, L.Lombard & Crous
 Clonostachys gneti Oudem.
 Clonostachys granuligera (Starbäck) Forin & Vizzini
 Clonostachys grammicospora
 Clonostachys grammicosporopsis
 Clonostachys impariphialis
 Clonostachys indica Prasher & R.Chauhan
 Clonostachys intermedia Schroers
 Clonostachys kowhaii
 Clonostachys krabiensis Tibpromma & K.D.Hyde
 Clonostachys lasiacidis
 Clonostachys levigata
 Clonostachys lucifer
 Clonostachys macrospora
 Clonostachys manihotis (Rick) Rossman, L.Lombard & Crous
 Clonostachys mellea (Teng & S.H.Ou) Z.Q.Zeng & W.Y.Zhuang
 Clonostachys miodochialis
 Clonostachys oblongispora
 Clonostachys parva (Schroers) Rossman, L.Lombard & Crous
 Clonostachys phyllophila Schroers
 Clonostachys pityrodes
 Clonostachys populi Harz
 Clonostachys pseudobotrytis Höhn.
 Clonostachys pseudochroleuca
 Clonostachys pseudosetosa (Samuels) Schroers
 Clonostachys pseudostriata
 Clonostachys pseudostriatopsis Hirooka & Tak.Kobay.
 Clonostachys pulvinata Petch
 Clonostachys ralfsii
 Clonostachys rhizophaga Schroers
 Clonostachys rogersoniana Schroers
 Clonostachys rosea (Link) Schroers, Samuels, Seifert & W.Gams
 Clonostachys rossmaniae
 Clonostachys samuelsii
 Clonostachys saulensis Lechat & J.Fourn.
 Clonostachys sesquicillii
 Clonostachys setosa
 Clonostachys simmonsii Massee
 Clonostachys solani
 Clonostachys spectabilis (Harz) Oudem.
 Clonostachys spinulosispora Lechat & J.Fourn.
 Clonostachys sporodochialis
 Clonostachys subquaternata
 Clonostachys theobromae
 Clonostachys tonduzii (Speg.) Rossman, L.Lombard & Crous
 Clonostachys tornata (Höhn.) Rossman, L.Lombard & Crous
 Clonostachys truncata (J.Luo & W.Y.Zhuang) Z.Q.Zeng & W.Y.Zhuang
 Clonostachys verrucispora
 Clonostachys vesiculosa (J.Luo & W.Y.Zhuang) Z.Q.Zeng & W.Y.Zhuang
 Clonostachys wenpingii (J.Luo & W.Y.Zhuang) Z.Q.Zeng & W.Y.Zhuang
 Clonostachys zelandiaenovae

References

Hypocreales genera
Bionectriaceae
Taxa named by August Carl Joseph Corda